The 2021 Orienteering World Cup was the 26th edition of the Orienteering World Cup. The 2021 Orienteering World Cup consisted of six individual events and four relay events. The events were located in Switzerland, Sweden, and Italy. The 2021 World Orienteering Championships in the Czech Republic were not included in the World Cup.

Events

Men

Women

Relay

Points distribution
The 40 best runners in each event are awarded points. The winner is awarded 100 points. In WC events 1 to 7, the six best results counts in the overall classification. In the finals (WC 8 and WC 9), both results count.

Overall standings
This section shows the  overall standings after all events.

Men

Women

Team
The table shows the  standings after all events. This was the first year where individual results counted towards the team world cup, meaning competitors contributed to the team's score in both relay and individual events.

References

External links
 World Cup Ranking - IOF

Orienteering World Cup seasons
Orienteering competitions
2021 in orienteering